Akkainovo (Aqqayın) is a rural locality (a village) in Mayadykovsky Selsoviet, Birsky District, Bashkortostan, Russia. The population was 53 as of 2010. There is 1 street.

Geography 
Akkainovo is located 34 km southwest of Birsk (the district's administrative centre) by road. Shelkanovo is the nearest rural locality.

References 

Rural localities in Birsky District